Carmine Falcone is a fictional character in DC Comics, portrayed as a powerful mob boss, an enemy of Batman, and a friend of the Wayne family. He has also been depicted in some versions as the illegitimate father of Catwoman. 

In live-action, the character has been portrayed in film by Tom Wilkinson in Batman Begins (2005) and John Turturro in The Batman (2022), and by John Doman in the television series Gotham (2014).

Background
Carmine Falcone made his debut in the four-part story Batman: Year One written by Frank Miller and David Mazzucchelli in 1987. In the comics, Falcone is a powerful Mafia chieftain nicknamed "The Roman", where his stranglehold over Gotham City's organized crime is referenced as "The Roman Empire" at least once. In Batman: Year One, his penthouse is designed in a Roman architectural style.

The character is based on Marlon Brando's portrayal of Don Vito Corleone from the 1972 film The Godfather. Jeph Loeb, writer of Batman: The Long Halloween, stated in an interview that he paralleled the Falcone family to that of the Corleone family: Falcone's power and wisdom akin to Vito Corleone, his son Alberto's personality and appearance that of Fredo Corleone, and his daughter Sofia's temper matching that of Sonny Corleone. Lastly, his elder son Mario's deportation to Sicily, physical appearance and desire to legitimize the Falcone family are all traits shared with Michael Corleone.

Fictional character biography
In a flashback in The Long Halloween, gangster Vincent Falcone brings his badly wounded son, Carmine, who had been shot several times by his rival, Luigi Maroni, to Thomas Wayne. Fearing Maroni would finish the job at a public hospital, he begs Wayne, one of the city's best doctors, to perform surgery at Wayne Manor. A young Bruce Wayne watches his father save Falcone's life. Years later at Thomas and Martha Wayne's funeral, Carmine Falcone, now part of his father's crime family, tells Bruce that he can always ask a favor of him should he need it.

In Batman: Year One, Falcone is shown to be the most powerful figure in Gotham City, with the mayor, city council, and much of Gotham's police force in his pocket and all of the city's criminal outfits under his control. His power comes under attack with the arrival of the mysterious vigilante Batman. Despite GCPD Commissioner Gillian B. Loeb's desperate attempts to stop him, Batman's attacks on Falcone's crime family become even more brazen and Falcone decides to have Batman killed. Batman further embarrasses Falcone by rescuing Catwoman when the mobster and his henchmen catch her trying to rob them. In the process, Catwoman leaves Falcone permanently scarred when she scratches him with the metal claws of her costume.

Falcone orders his nephew Johnny Viti to kidnap the family of Detective Jim Gordon, but the attempt is foiled. When Gordon and District Attorney Harvey Dent's investigations start threatening his power, Falcone orders an unsuccessful hit on Johnny out of fear that he might talk. The failed hit results in the Falcone family getting embroiled in a mob war with Viti's boss Carla in Chicago, which serves only to further diminish Falcone's influence in Gotham.

During The Long Halloween, the weakened Falcone family is targeted by a serial killer calling himself Holiday. When Batman and Dent burn his hoard of stolen cash, Falcone strikes back by hiring costumed "freaks" who become Batman's Rogues Gallery. Convinced that Dent is secretly Holiday, Falcone persuades his former rival Sal Maroni to kill Dent while standing trial for murder. Falcone arranges for Maroni to obtain a vial of acid, which he hurls at Dent during a court proceeding. The acid disfigures the left side of Dent's face, leading to his becoming Two-Face. Two-Face personally kills Falcone following a coin flip that lands on the scarred side. Falcone's son Alberto ultimately confesses to all of the Holiday killings in an attempt to be accepted into the family business.

In Batman: Dark Victory, Falcone's grave site is robbed and his body goes missing. In the end, it is revealed that Two-Face has Falcone's body in his possession, having frozen it using Mr. Freeze's cryogenic technology. Selina Kyle briefly visits the grave at the conclusion of the story, where it is revealed that she believes that Falcone is her biological father and is determined to learn the truth.

The New 52
Carmine Falcone appears in the second issue of Batman Eternal as a former mobster determined to reclaim his empire after Commissioner Gordon is framed for mass murder. It is revealed at the conclusion of the story that Falcone was unaware of the larger plot against Batman, and was simply informed that he would have a chance to strike by an anonymous letter sent to him by the Cluemaster.

DC Rebirth
In the "War of Jokes and Riddles" storyline, Falcone is contacted by the Joker with strict instructions to kill the Riddler within an hour. His men ultimately fail to complete the assignment, leading the Joker to have Falcone's men assassinated. The Penguin then takes over his business interests on Joker's behalf.

Family
The following are relatives of Carmine Falcone:

 Vincent Falcone – Carmine's father and the founder of the Falcone crime family.
 Carla Viti – Carmine's sister and the boss of the Viti crime family in Chicago.
 Louisa Falcone – Carmine's wife and mother of his three children. Her current whereabouts are unknown.
 Johnny Viti – Carla's son and Carmine's nephew. Part of the Viti family in Chicago.
 Lucia Viti – Carla's daughter and Carmine's niece.
 Sofia Falcone Gigante – Carmine's daughter who takes over as boss of the Falcone family. Mario later legally changes his sister's name to Sofia Gigante so he can cleanse the family name of her crimes.
 Alberto Falcone – Carmine's inept son, who is desperate to be accepted into the family.
 Mario Falcone – Carmine's son and a successful businessman who seeks to legitimize the Falcone family, even if it means turning on his siblings.
 Selina Kyle – Carmine's alleged daughter, although her parentage is never definitely proven.
 Kitrina Falcone – Carmine's estranged granddaughter and a skilled escape artist who becomes Catwoman's sidekick and apprentice.

In other media

Television

 Carmine Falcone appears in the TV series Gotham, portrayed by John Doman. He is depicted as a veteran Mafia Don who has Mayor James Aubrey, Commissioner Gillian B. Loeb, and specific members of the Gotham City Police Department in his pocket as well as Victor Zsasz as a go-to hitman. He also claims that Detective Jim Gordon's late father Peter, who previously served as Gotham's district attorney, was also on his payroll. Falcone's crime family includes associates such as accountant Arthur Penn. In the season one finale, "All Happy Families Are Alike", Falcone is wounded by Maroni's men. Gordon saves him and takes him, Cobblepot and Butch Gilzean to Falcone's safehouse. After the battle with Fish Mooney and Sal Maroni, he retires his criminal career and leaves Gotham. He returns in the second season to release Gordon from Blackgate prison where he was jailed for a false charge. In the third season, his son Mario Calvi is engaged to Gordon's ex Leslie Thompkins, but he becomes a target of Court of Owls assassins. Falcone learns from Gordon that his son is infected with Tetch virus. Gordon kills him to save Leslie. This leads Carmine to order Victor Zsasz to kill him, but changes his mind and cancels the hit. In the fourth season, Gordon begs him to remove Cobblepot from power, but declines due to his ill health. His daughter Sofia Falcone comes in Gotham to become a new boss and kill the Penguin. He returns in Gotham due to its gang war erupting in the city. Before he can bring Sofia home to protect her, he is killed by assassins, who were hired by Sofia.
 Carmine Falcone appears in the Justice League Action episode "Time Share", voiced by Jason J. Lewis. Chronos goes back in time in an attempt to prevent Batman's first fight against Carmine Falcone and his men, which was also his first case as the Dark Knight. However, Batman and Booster Gold are also sent back in time and defeat Carmine again, thus preserving the time stream.

Film

Live-action

 Carmine Falcone appears in Batman Begins, portrayed by Tom Wilkinson. He controls Gotham City's criminal underworld, flooding the city with drugs and crime, and serves as a symbol of Gotham's rottenness and corruption. With most city officials and cops either on his payroll or simply afraid to cross him, Falcone is effectively above the law, with few in the city willing to challenge his power. He has connections with Jonathan Crane and his benefactor Ra's al Ghul in drug smuggling business. He and his henchman are defeated by Bruce Wayne as Batman. While in the custody, Crane gives him fear toxin, driving him insane and is turned to Arkham Asylum. His crime organization is later taken over by Sal Maroni in The Dark Knight.

 Carmine Falcone appears in The Batman, portrayed by John Turturro. Similar to his Long Halloween incarnation, Falcone was saved by Thomas Wayne after getting shot as a young man, which was witnessed by Thomas' son, Bruce. Falcone is implied to be involved in the Waynes' murder; during Thomas's campaign for mayor, he asked Falcone to intimidate a journalist who had found evidence of Martha's family history of mental illness, but when Falcone had the journalist killed Thomas threatened to report this to the police and was killed a week later. Falcone also has an illegitimate daughter, Selina Kyle, whom he nearly kills, but she is saved by Batman. Before the police can take him away, he is killed by Riddler with a sniper rifle.

Animation
 Carmine Falcone appears in Batman: Year One, voiced by Alex Rocco.
 Carmine Falcone appears in the two-part animated film Batman: The Long Halloween, voiced by Titus Welliver.

Video games
 Tom Wilkinson reprises his role as Carmine Falcone in the 2005 video game adaptation of Batman Begins. 
 Carmine Falcone's crime family is featured in DC Universe Online. In the villain campaign, Killer Croc mentions that he has been hired by the Falcones to put an end to their competitor Bane's drug trafficking operations. Some of the Falcones are seen in a cutscene with Penguin at the Iceberg Lounge where he makes plans to take advantage of the ongoing gang war in Gotham.
 The Falcone Crime Family (specifically Carmine) are mentioned several times in Batman: Arkham City and Batman: Arkham Origins.
 Carmine Falcone appears in the mobile game Batman: Arkham Underworld, voiced by Jon Polito. Though not appearing physically, Falcone mentions that he is under heat from the newly-elected district attorney Harvey Dent and will occasionally pop up after completed missions (specifically ones that involve attacking his businesses to build the player's own criminal empire) to either express his admiration of the player's "moxie" or give thinly-veiled threats warning the player to back off.
 Carmine Falcone appears in Batman: The Telltale Series, voiced by Richard McGonagle. He is shown to be part of a clique that includes Mayor Hamilton Hill, Thomas Wayne, and Martha Wayne. Acting as the muscle for the group, Falcone takes complete control of the city's criminal underworld shortly after the Waynes are murdered.

See also
List of Batman family enemies
Batman and the Monster Men
Carl Grissom

References

External links
 Carmine Falcone at DC Comics Wiki
 Carmine Falcone at Comic Vine

Comics characters introduced in 1987
Characters created by Frank Miller (comics)
Fictional immigrants to the United States
Fictional gangsters
Fictional Italian American people
Fictional crime bosses
Male characters in film
Male film villains
Male characters in television
DC Comics film characters
DC Comics television characters
Action film villains
Cultural depictions of the Mafia
Fictional murdered people